Asseco Poland SA is a multinational software company, with clients primarily in the banking and finance industries. It was founded in 1991, and its headquarters are in Rzeszów, Poland. Asseco is one of the largest corporations in the technology sector quoted on the Warsaw Stock Exchange. The current corporation is the result of a 2004 merger between Asset Soft AS and COMP Rzeszów SA.

The consolidated revenues of the Asseco Group in 2020 amounted to PLN 12.19 billion, and the net profit amounted to PLN 401.9 million. The operating profit amounted to over PLN 23.8 million.

History
Asseco was founded as COMP Rzeszów in 1991 by Adam Goral. It began as a ketchup factory, but Goral focused on the development of the manufacturer's information technology department, which soon became the center of the business. The company became multinational with the 2004 purchase of the Slocak company Asset Soft, and the company was renamed Asseco. It continued to make acquisitions, purchasing the Polish software companies Softbank and Prokom, and ventured outside of the former Eastern Bloc with a 2010 purchase of the Israeli software company Formula Systems. It has since expanded to a presence in over 50 countries.

Structure of the company

Asseco Poland SA is headquartered in Rzeszów and Warsaw with offices throughout Poland, and is present in more than 50 countries around the world, with subsidiaries in Slovakia, the Czech Republic, Austria, Lithuania, Germany, Romania, Hungary, Spain, United States, Israel, Japan, Turkey and the Balkans. The company was ranked sixth in the Truffle 100 ranking of the largest software producers in Europe.

Poland:

 Asseco Poland S.A.
 Asseco Business Solutions S.A.
 Asseco Data Systems S.A.
 Novum Sp. z o.o.
 Postdata S.A.
 Gladstone Consulting
 SKG S.A.
 DahliaMatic Sp. z o.o.

Israel:

 Matrix
 Sapiens
 Magic Software

Central Europe:

 Asseco Central Europe a.s.
 Asseco Solutions a.s.
 Asseco Central Europe Magyarorszag Zrt.
 Asseco Hungary Zrt.
 DanubePay, a. s.
 Asseco Solutions AG
 InterWay, a. s.
 exe, a. s.
 eDocu, a. s.
 Asseco BERIT

South Eastern Europe:

 Asseco South Eastern Europe S.A. (Asseco SEE Grupa)
 Asseco SEE d.o.o., Bosnia and Herzegovina
 Asseco SEE o.o.d., Bulgaria
 Asseco SEE d.o.o., Croatia
 Asseco SEE Sh.p.k., Kosovo
 Asseco SEE d.o.o.e.l., Macedonia
 Asseco SEE d.o.o., Montenegro
 Asseco SEE s.r.l., Romania
 Asseco SEE d.o.o., Serbia
 Asseco SEE d.o.o., Slovenia
 Asseco SEE Teknoloji A.Ş., Turkey

Western Europe:

 Asseco Spain SA
 Necomplus, S.L.
 Asseco PST

Northern Europe:

 Asseco Denmark A/S
 Peak Consulting Group
 Sintagma, UAB
 Asseco Lietuva, UAB
 CodeConnexion

See also

Warsaw Stock Exchange
WIG30
Economy of Poland

References

External links
 Asseco Poland Official Website
 Asseco Group Official Website

Software companies established in 1991
Polish companies established in 1991
Multinational companies headquartered in Poland
Software companies of Poland
Rzeszów
Companies listed on the Warsaw Stock Exchange
Polish brands
Information technology companies of Poland
2004 mergers and acquisitions